Leonardo Palacios (born 2 April 1933) is an Ecuadorian footballer. He played in four matches for the Ecuador national football team in 1963. He was also part of Ecuador's squad for the 1963 South American Championship.

References

1933 births
Living people
Ecuadorian footballers
Ecuador international footballers
Association football midfielders
People from Napo Province